Shaykh Sulayman Bal (died 1775) was an 18th-century African leader, warrior, and Islamic scholar, from the Futa Toro region in what is today western Mali.

In the 1760s and 1770s, Sulayman Bal founded one of the earliest Fulani Jihad States. Inspired by the Jihads of Alfa Ibrahima Nuhu who led the Imamate of Futa Jallon from 1725, Sulayman Bal led a revolt in the Fulani Denyanke kingdom. Aimed at overthrowing the traditional aristocracy, the movement only succeeded after his death. In its place, a clerical oligarchy rose which quickly came into conflict with its neighbors. The Brakna Moors were repulsed after a long history of raids in Futa Toro, and non-Muslim states were invaded.
Sulayman Bal was succeeded by Abd al-Qadir who consolidated the Futa Toro state, created a military aristocracy, and became one of the first in a line of West African leaders to take the title almami. In 1796, Futa Toro was defeated during the battle of Bounghoy by the non-Muslim Cayor kingdom led by the Damel Amary Ngoné Ndella Fall, and Abd al-Qādir was killed in 1807, to be replaced by a less oligarchic council of clan leaders.

References
 Holger Weiss. Attempts to Establish an Islamic Economy: A Survey on Zakāt in some Nineteenth-Century Muslim States of the Bilād as-Sūdān. Paper presented at the SAL-workshop: "State and Everyday Life in Africa", Accra, November–December 2000.
 David Robinson. Chiefs and Clerics: Abdul Bokar Kan and Futa Toro, 1853–1891. Clarendon Press. (1975).

1775 deaths
Malian warriors
18th-century Muslim scholars of Islam
Malian Muslims
Year of birth unknown